Treasure is the third studio album by Scottish alternative rock band Cocteau Twins, released on 1 November 1984 by 4AD. With this album, the band settled on what would, from then on, be their primary lineup: vocalist Elizabeth Fraser, guitarist Robin Guthrie and bass guitarist Simon Raymonde. The album also reflected the group's embrace of the distinctive ethereal sound they became associated with.

The album reached number 29 on the UK Albums Chart, becoming the band's first UK Top 40 album, and charted for eight weeks. It also became one of the band's most critically successful releases, although the band considered it underdeveloped. The track "Lorelei" became a minor dance hit during the mid-1980s.

Background and music 
The album was recorded from August to September 1984 at Palladium Studios, Edinburgh and Rooster, West London.

Record label executive Ivo Watts-Russell originally tried to hire Brian Eno and Daniel Lanois to produce the album. However, Eno felt the band did not need him and Guthrie ended up producing the album. Pitchfork noted that the album's drum machine backing added a sharp edge in contrast to the band's ethereal sound and Elizabeth Fraser's "angelic vocals".

Raymonde alluded to Treasure being rushed and unfinished, while Guthrie referred to it as "an abortion", "our worst album by a mile", and to the period in which it was made as "arty-farty pre-Raphaelite". Nonetheless, as Raymonde observed, "It seems to be the one that people like the best and it's probably sold the best".

Reception and release 

Treasure is considered by many fans to be the band's finest work, and has received critical acclaim. Pitchfork wrote, "Cocteau Twins' third album was titled simply enough. Treasure  was an adjective for the endlessly inventive melodic lines you'd find buried in these songs, and a verb for what you'd do with them for years to come", and noted that the record signalled the start of Cocteau Twins' "signature ethereality". Ned Raggett of AllMusic complimented its "accomplished variety", saying, "Treasure lives up to its title and then some as a thorough and complete triumph". BBC Online wrote, "Treasure was where the Cocteau Twins first got it 100 percent right". Steve Sutherland in Melody Maker described the album as "true brilliance" and stated that the band were "the voice of God".

In March 2018, the album was repressed on 180g vinyl using new masters created from high definition files transferred from the original analogue tapes.

Legacy and accolades
Jeff Terich of Treblezine placed the album on his list of best dream pop albums, stating: "In contrast to the band's more abrasive post-punk albums that arrived earlier, Treasure is an exercise in making beauty seem alien, and making alienation seem sublime, for that matter". Slant Magazine listed the album at No. 74 on its list of the best albums of the 1980s, while NME named Treasure the 37th best album of 1984. Pitchfork listed Treasure as the 98th best album of the 1980s. Paste magazine's Josh Jackson listed the album at No. 38 on his list of "The 50 Best Post-Punk Albums", describing it as "the first full realization of the band's ethereal pop sound". PopMatters included it in their list of the "12 Essential 1980s Alternative Rock Albums" saying, "Fraser's ability to deliver her nonsensical lyrics with the diaphanous touch of a moth or with the muscle of a ravenous lion is astonishing". Jennifer Makowsky concluded that "Treasure is an aptly titled album". The album was included in the 2008 edition of 1001 Albums You Must Hear Before You Die. In Beautiful Noise, the shoegaze/dream pop documentary, Robert Smith of The Cure calls it one of the most romantic records ever recorded, so much that he played it as he was getting ready on his wedding day.

Track listing 

Initial pressings of the Canadian LP release included the "Aikea-Guinea" 12" single as a bonus.

Personnel 
Cocteau Twins
 Elizabeth Fraser – vocals, production
 Robin Guthrie – guitar, production
 Simon Raymonde – bass guitar, production

Production
 Droston J. Madden – engineering
 Jon Turner – engineering
 23 Envelope – sleeve design

Charts

References

External links 

 

Cocteau Twins albums
1984 albums
4AD albums